The West Indies cricket team toured Australia from November 1979 to January 1980 and played a three-match Test series against the Australia national cricket team. The West Indies won the Test series 2–0, retaining the Frank Worrell Trophy.

The series was notable for several major events in cricket history. This was the first time that West Indies played their original "fearsome foursome" of fast bowlers, consisting of Andy Roberts, Michael Holding, Joel Garner and Colin Croft, in an official Test match. It was also notable for Viv Richards' dominant batting display of 396 runs in 4 innings at an average of 96.50, with a lowest score of 74. His overall aggregate in that tour in international matches was of 881 runs at an astonishing batting average of 97.88. Viv Richards' performance was rated by Australian media as one of the finest ever in Australia. The performance of Viv Richards was even more remarkable considering that he was suffering from a groin, leg and back injury throughout the tour. Wisden described Viv's batting as 

West Indies won their first Test series on Australian soil. It also marked the beginning of West Indies' dominance in world cricket, as they remained unbeaten for the next 15 years (1980-1995) until eventually losing to Mark Taylor's Australia in 1995.

The scheduling of the Test matches was unusual, in that Australia alternated between playing Tests against West Indies and against England.  This format was not repeated in subsequent years when two teams toured Australia in the same season.

In addition to the Test series, the teams played in a triangular Limited Overs International (LOI) tournament which also involved the England team. West Indies won this tournament, defeating England in the final.

Squads

Tour Matches

Test series

First Test

Second Test

Third Test

Benson & Hedges World Series Cup

The Benson & Hedges World Series Cup  was a tri-nation (ODI) series held in Australia from 27 November 1979 to 22 January 1980. It was held between Australia, West Indies, England. The tournament was played in Round-robin format in which England and West Indies reached the finals where West Indies won the series 2-0. 

Vivian Richards scored the most runs in the tournament with 485 runs (7 innings) at an average of 97.00. His highest score came against Australia where he scored 153* at MCG, While Dennis Lillee topped the bowling list with 20 wickets (8 innings) at an average of 12.70.

References

External links
 When the four-man apocalypse hit Australia, ESPNcricinfo, 8 December 2015

1979 in Australian cricket
1979 in West Indian cricket
1979–80 Australian cricket season
1980 in Australian cricket
1980 in West Indian cricket
International cricket competitions from 1975–76 to 1980
1979-80